Andrew Thomas Blowers  is a British geographer and environmentalist and Emeritus Professor of the Faculty of Arts & Social Sciences at the Open University.

Biography 
Blowers attended Colchester Royal Grammar School and won an Open Exhibition to read Geography at Durham University. After periods teaching at Newcastle Polytechnic and Kingston Polytechnic he joined the Open University, where he eventually became Dean of Social Sciences.

His academic work has focused on environmental protection, particularly nuclear waste management. In 1993 he campaigned against the opening of the Thermal Oxide Reprocessing Plant at Sellafield.

Honours
He received an OBE for services to environmental protection in the 2000 Birthday Honours. He became a Fellow of the Royal Society of Arts in 2004.

References 

Living people
People educated at Colchester Royal Grammar School
Academics of the Open University
Royal Society of Arts
Alumni of Hatfield College, Durham
Year of birth missing (living people)